The 1934 Florida Gators football team represented the University of Florida during the 1934 college football season. The season was the high-water mark of Dennis K. Stanley's three-year tenure as the head coach of the Florida Gators football team. The highlights of the season included hard-fought victories over the Auburn Tigers and Georgia Tech Yellow Jackets, both fellow Southeastern Conference (SEC) members, and the VPI Gobblers and NC State Wolfpack, two out-of-conference Southern teams. Stanley's 1934 Florida Gators finished the year with a 6–3–1 overall record and a 2–2–1 record in the SEC, placing seventh in the thirteen-member SEC.

Schedule

Postseason
Wally Brown was named second-team All-SEC. After 1934, no Gators team would win six or more games again until the 1952 Florida Gators football team.

References

Florida
Florida Gators football seasons
Florida Gators football